Yavanna is an extinct genus of tree ferns known from the Early Cretaceous Cerro Negro Formation of what are now the South Shetland Islands, Antarctica.

References 

Cyatheales
Early Cretaceous plants
Aptian life
Cretaceous Antarctica
Fossils of Antarctica
Fossil taxa described in 2013
Organisms named after Tolkien and his works